Burl Fowler Stadium is a stadium in Monett, Missouri.  It is used for Football, Men's Soccer and Women's Soccer, and is the home field of the Monett Cubs. Opening in 1968 and expanded since, the stadium holds approximately 5,000 people.

History
It is named for Burl Fowler, who led the Monett Cubs to two football state championships during his tenure. The stadium was named in his honor in 1978. The field is named Kenley Richardson Field after Monett High schools first athletic director and a pioneer for many of the athletic programs in Monett.

The first game held here occurred on September 13, 1968. In front of 2,000 fans, the Cubs prevailed 18–12 against the Bolivar Liberators. Raymond Krueger scored the first touchdown in the new facility on a reverse handoff from Bob Meuser after a Liberators' punt.

In 1977 the stadium hosted its first state championship game in which the Cubs won their second state championship title.

Athletics
Since 1968 the stadium has been a part of many Big 8 Conference, district, and state championships.

Big 8 Conference Championships
 Football - 1971, 1976, 1977, 1979, 1980, 1983, 1990, 1996, 1998, 2004, 2007, 2008

District Championships
 Football - 1985, 1990, 1996, 1997, 1998, 2004, 2007, 2008, 2012, 2014, 2016
 Men's Soccer - 2012, 2013, 2014, 2015, 2016, 2017, 2018, 2019

State Championships
 Football - 1971, 1977, 2016

Rivalry Bowl Games

Barry County Brawl - Monett vs Cassville
 2013 Cassville 27-0
 2014 Monett 38-0
 2015 Monett 34-6
 2016 Monett 21-20
 2017 Cassville 21-0
 2018 Cassville 49-12
 2019 Cassville 21-14
 2020 Cassville 50-0
 2021 Cassville 21-20

References

Stadiums
Sports venues in Missouri